Merkheuli is a village in Abkhazia, Georgia. A 2011 census recorded a population of 839 people.

History 
Fragments of Greek pottery, date back to the 6th century BC, have been found in the village.

Merkheuli was established in 1879.

Following the Armenian genocide, many Armenians resettled in Merkheuli, eventually becoming the majority ethnicity in the town.

Notable people
Lavrentiy Beria, chief of the NKVD from 1938 to 1945, was born in Merkheuli in 1899.

Population

Climate 
Merkheuli has a humid subtropical climate (Cfa.)

See also
 Gulripshi District

Note

References 

Populated places in Gulripshi District
Sukhum Okrug